Bob Bennett is a former rugby league footballer and coach who played professionally for the Past Brothers, Brisbane and Collegians and The Cowboys, Warwick sides and also coached Lae 'Bombers' in 1995 as well as Papua New Guinea at the 2000 World Cup.

His brother, Wayne, has coached Australia and Queensland as well as several National Rugby League clubs.

Early years
Bennett grew up in a working-class family in nearby Warwick with an alcoholic father who deserted the family. He has two sisters, Michelle and Gretta and a brother, Wayne.

Playing career
Bennett played from fullback to front row during his career and spent from 1974-1981 seasons with Past Brothers, Brisbane. In  1979 he represented he represented the Qld Police. In 1981 he moved to Warwick in Qld. and Captain/Coached Collegians 'Á' Grade to 3 constitutive premierships 1982, 83 & 84.

Coaching career
Bennett was, like his brother, involved with the Queensland Police and during the 1980s he coached the Police's Toowoomba Clydsdales side to a State Championship. He later became the first coach of the Australian Police Rugby League.

Bennett was appointed the coach of the Papua New Guinea side in 1996 and led them to the 2000 World Cup. He remained with the side until 2006 when he was replaced by his former captain, Adrian Lam. Bennett became the Kumuls manager and served in this position at the 2008 World Cup.

Later years
Bennett worked as a detective on the Gold Coast for the Queensland Police. After leaving the police he worked as the Manager of Safety and Security at Treasury Casino in Brisbane.

At the Legislative Assembly of Queensland 2006 elections Bennett stood for the Queensland National Party in the Southport electorate. The seat was a safe Labor seat and incumbent Peter Lawlor retained the seat.

In 2010 Bennett was appointed as the first CEO of the Men of League Foundation. He no longer lives with his brother Wayne.

References

Living people
Australian police officers
Australian rugby league administrators
Australian rugby league coaches
Australian rugby league players
Country New South Wales rugby league team players
National Party of Australia members of the Parliament of Queensland
Papua New Guinea national rugby league team coaches
Rugby league five-eighths
Veivers family
Year of birth missing (living people)